José Isabel (Lugo) Cecena (born August 20, 1963 in Ciudad Obregón, Mexico) is a Mexican former Major League Baseball pitcher who played in  with the Texas Rangers. Jose was signed as a non-drafted free agent by Philadelphia Phillies (December 10, 1985). Jose was selected by Texas Rangers from Philadelphia Phillies in the minor league draft (December 9, 1986).

External links

 Baseball Almanac

1963 births
Baseball players from Sonora
Living people
Major League Baseball pitchers
Major League Baseball players from Mexico
Mexican expatriate baseball players in the United States
Texas Rangers players
People from Ciudad Obregón
Acereros de Monclova players
Buffalo Bisons (minor league) players
Carolina Mudcats players
Clearwater Phillies players
Diablos Rojos del México players
Oklahoma City 89ers players
Charlotte Rangers players
Reading Phillies players
Saraperos de Saltillo players
Tulsa Drillers players